Denham is the administrative town for the Shire of Shark Bay, Western Australia. At the 2016 census, Denham had a population of 754. The town also has an attractive beach and a jetty popular with those interested in fishing and boating.

The Denham region was the second area of the Australian mainland discovered by European sailors, after the western coast of Cape York Peninsula.

History
 
On 25 October 1616, Dutch explorer Dirk Hartog and crew came unexpectedly upon "various islands, which were, however, found uninhabited." He made landfall at an island now called Dirk Hartog Island off the coast of Shark Bay. Hartog spent three days examining the coast and nearby islands. He named the area Eendrachtsland after his ship, but this name has not endured. Finding little of interest, Hartog continued sailing northwards charting this previously undiscovered coast to about 22° South. In 1696 the Dutch explorer Willem de Vlamingh landed on the island. Later explorers included William Dampier, and the Frenchmen Freycinet, Hamelin and Baudin in the early 19th century.

The coast remained uninhabited by Europeans until the middle of the 19th century. The first pearls found in Western Australia were discovered in Shark Bay in 1854 by a Lieutenant Helpman, the so-called 'Admiral of the Swan River Navy', who found the dense beds of pearl-shell oysters that are abundant there.

The earlier name to that of Denham was "Freshwater Camp" when it was a pearling camp.

Population
In the 2016 Census, there were 754 people in Denham. 72.1% of people were born in Australia and 84.7% of people spoke only English at home. 
The most common responses for religion were No Religion 38.3%, Anglican 22.1% and Catholic 18.7%.

Facilities
There is a Crisis centre, two Churches, a unit of the Red Cross, Returned Services League (RSL), plus the normal amenities / facilities / social organisations to be found in any small Australian rural town; for example, two grocery shops, hardware, hairdressing salon, two hotels, three caravan parks, various types of holiday accommodation, butcher, tourist and souvenir shops.
There is also the unique Old Pearler Restaurant by reservation and B.Y.O. 
Social organisation include a bowls club, golf club, speedway, arts society, film club, pistol club, bridge club, crafts group, youth association and facilities for various sports, for example netball, cricket, football. There is no resident Doctor but a full-time Nurse in charge of the local Silver Chain Nursing post. Currently a medical practitioner flies in for two days once a week. Emergency services are operated entirely by volunteers (Fire Brigade, Ambulance, State Emergency Service (SES) and Marine Rescue).  Electricity is provided by a wind-diesel power plant. In 2020, Western Australia’s remote energy provider Horizon Power embarked on a ground-breaking hydrogen demonstration project to replace the diesel generators, with a trial commencing in late 2022.

Tourism
The tourist industry - which functions mainly from April until September - witnesses an influx of over 250,000 people passing through the Shire on the main North West Coastal Highway of which approximately 110,000 actually come into the communities including Denham and Monkey Mia. The 150 km stretch of road linking the highway with Denham is known as World Heritage Drive.

A number of tour operators have land and water based operations using both Monkey Mia and Denham as their base.

Ocean Park Aquarium is located 10 kilometers south of Denham, and has Western Australia's largest shark lagoon. It is one of the very few places in the country where tiger sharks can be seen, the daily shark feedings are a major visitor drawcard.

Transport
There is an all-weather airstrip, Monkey Mia Airport (also known as Denham Airport or Shark Bay Airport), which has Regional Express Airlines operating regular services as the main tourist fly in location for Denham and Monkey Mia.

Twinned Town
Twinned with Denham, Buckinghamshire, United Kingdom

Climate
Denham has a semi-arid climate typical of the Gascoyne. Summers are warm but not as hot as areas further inland due to coastal influence. The majority of Denham's rainfall falls in winter due to cold fronts moving in off the Indian Ocean; however, the town receives far less rainfall from these systems than areas further south such as Geraldton and Perth. The period from September to March is largely rainless apart from possible erratic thunderstorms or influence from tropical cyclones.

See also

 Henry Mangles Denham

References

Towns in Western Australia
Shire of Shark Bay